Osiris is an unincorporated community in Cedar County, in the U.S. state of Missouri.

History
A post office called Osiris was established in 1901, and remained in operation until 1906. The community was named after Osiris, the Egyptian god.

References

Unincorporated communities in Cedar County, Missouri
Unincorporated communities in Missouri